Merle Alison Hapes (May 19, 1919July 18, 1994) was a professional American football fullback in the National Football League (NFL). He played two seasons for the New York Giants (1942, 1946).

He and quarterback Frank Filchock were involved in a gambling scandal in 1946 in which they allegedly took bribes to fix the 1946 NFL Championship Game.

Since the betting scandal meant he was indefinitely suspended from playing professional football in the United States, he went to Canada to play in the Canadian Football League. He played one season for the Hamilton Tigers in 1949. The Tigers became the Hamilton Tiger-Cats in 1950, but Hapes was injured for the entire season. For the next two seasons he was an assistant coach with the Tiger-Cats, but returned to play as a backup for two final seasons, winning the Grey Cup with Hamilton in 1953.

Hapes returned to the States and worked in the Civil Service and the Department of Defence until 1982.  In 1993 Hapes was inducted into the Athletic Hall of Fame of Mississippi.

Hapes died on July 18, 1994.

References

External links

 
 

1919 births
1994 deaths
American football fullbacks
American players of Canadian football
Hamilton Tigers football players
Hamilton Tiger-Cats players
New York Giants players
Ole Miss Rebels football players
Ontario Rugby Football Union players
People from Garden Grove, California
Players of American football from California
Sportspeople from Orange County, California